Dzhasharbek Uzdenov (born 25 January, 1967, Kızıl-Oktyabr, Stavropol Krai) is a Russian political figure and a deputy of the 8th State Duma.
 
In 1985-1987, Uzdenov served at the Soviet–Afghan War. From 2009 to 2013, he was deputy of the People's Assembly of Karachay-Cherkessia of the 4th convocation. From 2020 to 2021, Uzdenov was the Minister of Natural Resources and Ecology of Karachay-Cherkessia. Since September 2021, he has served as deputy of the 8th State Duma.
 
According to Kommersant, Uzdenov missed all the 23 Duma sessions carried out in the autumn of 2021.

References
 

 

1962 births
Living people
United Russia politicians
21st-century Russian politicians
Eighth convocation members of the State Duma (Russian Federation)